Krivi Put is a village located in a forested area near Senj, in Lika-Senj County, Croatia.

Its earliest settlers founded the village in 1605, favouring it as good grazing land for their cattle. The nearby villages of Veljun, Serdari, Alan, Krmpote and Podbilo were also founded by Bunjevci settlers around the same time. The village celebrates an annual holiday on August 5.

Name 
Although krivi put means wrong way in modern Croatian, the older and more correct translation is curvy or bendy road, which reflects its location since roads leading up to the village are steep and curvy because of the mountainous terrain.

Demographics
In the 2011 census, the village had a population of 33, most of whom are Bunjevci, an ethnic group with a distinct identity and traditions.

Today, the majority of Krivi Put's population are farmers.

Notable people 
Former inhabitants include:
 Rudy Perpich, former governor of Minnesota.
 The parents of Ante Pavelić, Fascist leader of the Axis Powers allied Independent State of Croatia.
 The antecedents of former NBA player and coach Rudy Tomjanovich.

References

Populated places in Lika-Senj County